Carlo Donat-Cattin (26 June 1919 – 17 March 1991) was an Italian politician and trade unionist. A member of Christian Democracy, he was several times minister of the Italian Republic. He was leader of the internal left current of the DC Forza Nuove (New Forces).

Biography
Donat-Cattin was born at Finale Ligure. His father was from Turin, where Donat-Cattin moved at a young age. During World War II he fought with the "White faction" (Christian-Democrat) of the Italian resistance movement.

In 1950 he took part in the foundation of the Italian Confederation of Workers' Trade Unions (Italian: Confederazione Italiana Sindacati Lavoratori, abbreviated as CISL). In the meantime he entered Christian Democracy (Italian Democrazia Cristiana, shortly DC), for which he was communal counsellor in Turin and, from 1953, provincial counsellor at the province of Turin.

Donat-Cattin was elected for the first time to the Italian Chamber of Deputies in 1958, a position he held until 1979, when he was elected to the Italian Senate. He was minister several times, first as Minister of Welfare and Health (Rumor II, III, Colombo and Andreotti I Cabinets (1969–1972), then as Minister of Mezzogiorno (Rumor IV, 1973) and, from 1974 to 1978, Minister of Industry and Trade in four consecutive governments (Moro IV and V, Andreotti III and IV). Belonging to the left wing of the party, in 1978 he became vice-secretary of DC. Donat-Cattin was initially in favour of dialogue towards DC's historical rival, the Italian Communist Party (Italian: Partito Comunista Italiano, or PCI), but after 1979 he became a supporter of the preambolo theory, which aimed to exclude PCI from any state charge. In 1980, however, after his son Marco was discovered to be a member of the far-left terrorist formation Prima Linea, he abandoned any public position and left politics for a while.

In 1986 he was chosen as Minister of Health in the second Bettino Craxi-led government. At the time, he became a firm advocate of collaboration between DC and Craxi's party, the Italian Socialist Party. In 1989 he was Minister of Welfare in the Andreotti VI government.

He died at Montecarlo in 1991.

References

1919 births
1991 deaths
People from the Province of Savona
Christian Democracy (Italy) politicians
Italian Ministers of Health
Government ministers of Italy
Deputies of Legislature III of Italy
Deputies of Legislature IV of Italy
Deputies of Legislature V of Italy
Deputies of Legislature VI of Italy
Deputies of Legislature VII of Italy
Senators of Legislature VIII of Italy
Senators of Legislature IX of Italy
Senators of Legislature X of Italy
Italian resistance movement members
Italian trade unionists
Italian male journalists
20th-century Italian journalists
20th-century Italian male writers